Acoustiques is a live album by French duo Les Rita Mitsouko. "Les Consonnes" and "La Tailles Du Bambou" were new songs at the time of release and made their début on the album.

Track listing

References

External links
Acoustiques release history

Les Rita Mitsouko albums
1996 live albums
Virgin Records live albums